'eSagu' is a web-based personalized agro-advisory system which uses Information Technology to solve the unscientific agricultural practices. Sagu means cultivation in Telugu-local language of Telangana Andhra Pradesh, the region in which the project started.
E-Sagu means electronic cultivation.
It exploits the advances in Information Technology to build a cost-effective agricultural information dissemination system to disseminate expert agriculture knowledge to the farming community to improve the crop productivity.

It is a joint research project of Media lab asia and IIIT Hyderabad

Recognition
 eSagu was declared the best e-governance project at the Computer Society of India (CSI) and Nihilent e-Governance Awards for 2005-06 ([Nihilent e-Governance Awards http://www.csinihilent-egovernanceawards.org])
 eSagu  features as a  select entry among  worldwide latest novel Internet applications in the book "Innovative Application Case study 2006" published by Institute for Information Industry, a not-for-profit Think Tank for Taiwanese  Ministry of Economic Affairs in Taipei. 
 eSagu was listed as one of the top three e-Governance projects (the other two are BHOOMI and SAMPARK) of India in the video film on “Next e Governance Plan”, November 2005.

References

External links
 eSagu Home Page
 Media lab asia
 Chief Coordinator
 Nihilent Technologies 

Research projects